The 2022 City of Lincoln Council election took place on 5 May 2022 to elect members of City of Lincoln Council in Lincolnshire, England. This was held on the same day as other local elections.

Results summary

Ward results

Abbey

Birchwood

Boultham

Carholme

Castle

Glebe

Hartsholme

Minster

Moorland

Park

Witham

References

Lincoln
2022
2020s in Lincolnshire
May 2022 events in the United Kingdom